NewsRx is a media and technology company focusing on digital media, printed media, news services, and knowledge discovery through its BUTTER platform.  In 1995 the company was the world's largest producer of health news. The company publishes 194 newsweeklies in health and other fields, which are distributed to subscribers and partners including Factiva, the Wall Street Journal Professional Edition, Thomson Reuters, ProQuest, and Cengage Learning. C W Henderson founded the company in 1984 and its first publication was AIDS Weekly.  In the early 2000s, the firm added the imprint, VerticalNews to publish newsweeklies in non-health fields. Now based in Atlanta, Georgia, the company reports through its daily news service and publishes reference books through its partner, ScholarlyEditions. NewsRx launched its BUTTER platform in 2015, which is a knowledge discovery engine that delivers its content to academics, researchers, and professionals.

History

The idea for the first newsletter originated at an international conference on AIDS sponsored by the Centers for Disease Control & Prevention (CDC). A staff member commented to CW Henderson on the need for a publication to condense the rapid rise in information about the disease. In 1984, Henderson created CW Henderson Publisher, which became NewsRx in 2004.

That same year, the company distributed its first journal, CDC AIDS Weekly, (which split into AIDS Weekly and Medical Letter on the CDC & FDA) to an international audience. The first subscriber was the Soviet Union. Other subscribers include physicians, educators, government agencies, and pharmaceutical companies.

The articles in AIDS Weekly discussed social issues of the disease to medical research. The newsweekly included “shorts” to explain as much as was known about unfolding information and events.

Before the World Wide Web, NewsRx coordinated with the National AIDS Information Clearinghouse to provide information on the disease. The CDC AIDS Weekly Infoline provided a list of upcoming AIDS seminars as well as names and addresses of over 65 AIDS periodicals published worldwide.

The information published in AIDS Weekly came primarily from the government organization Centers for Disease Control (CDC). Though the newsweekly had no direct ties to the CDC other than as a source for information, a CDC official described the publication as “highly informative.”  Other sources of information for this and other titles were the nearby Emory University medical library and international agencies. Articles included summaries of peer-reviewed research, conference reports, news releases, and compilations from other health and medical organizations.

However, in the beginning, some critics were offended by the fact that NewsRx was a non-governmental agency distributing statistics that were available for free in official versions from the government. (see Controversy)

In 1988, the firm added Cancer Weekly and it added Blood Weekly in 1993. The company added Vaccine Weekly in 1995, followed by over 100 more medical-related titles.

In 1999, the firm also adopted Artificial Intelligence Journalist (AIJ) which uses robotics, machine learning, algorithms, logic, and automated reasoning to provide computer-assisted reporting and data driven journalism. The software shortens the time from news event to news distribution.

In 2007, the firm introduced VerticalNews. 

The firm also adopted site licenses, including  the ability for users to download reports showing the types of information used in a given organization—information previously restricted to the NewsRx staff. The system recognizes IP addresses to facilitate research activities.

On April 22, 2015, NewsRx announced hiring new VP and Publisher Kalani Rosell. The business development office opened in 2016 in New Haven, Connecticut, headed by Rosell.

BUTTER 
In 2015, NewsRx started BUTTER, which stands for Better Understanding Through Technology & Emerging Research, a business intelligence and data analytics platform with emerging research and new discoveries. It has content for researchers, academics, and investors, using a New Discovery Index (NDI) that analyzes discoveries worldwide by quarter and new discoveries within specific topic areas.

BUTTER uses a search engine and publishes 10,000 new articles a day (11.4 million articles as of March, 2016).

BUTTER's platform creates content 30 minutes after stock markets close, monitoring all market movements, new SEC and patent filings, trademarks, and financial and investment decisions.

Controversies

NewsRx is staffed by journalists rather than medical professionals. At the company's beginnings, Newsweek magazine commented that AIDS Weekly, as a non-government entity, should not be reporting on topics that included policy, research, and statistics that some considered exclusive to the government. The head of the Centers for Disease Control and Prevention (CDC) AIDS task force at the time was misquoted as stating that he disagreed with having the CDC name associated with the newsweekly. On the contrary, every issue of the CDC AIDS Weekly included an advisory caption, “…not sponsored by, endorsed by, affiliated with, or officially connected with the CDC.” Other staffers within the CDC supported NewsRx's view to bring AIDS awareness to the public eye. The Boston Globe reported that AIDS Weekly was a necessary “watchdog” publication providing needed information to the public. Other articles appeared supporting NewsRx in the Wall Street Journal, The New York Times, and USA Today, for what they said to be its impact in AIDS awareness and investigative journalism.

CW Henderson's role as executive editor at the firm was discussed in an article in Editor and Publisher, focusing on the influence of pharmaceutical companies on news publications. Henderson opposed pharmaceutical company influence on reporters as well as premature reporting of experiments.

The firm was also involved with The New York Times in controversial breaking news about AIDS studies that had purposely been tampered with at the CDC. On at least 5 occasions, research on the causes of AIDS and other viral diseases might have been tampered with. CDC AIDS Weekly published an internal CDC memorandum on the incident.

In 2010, the firm's VerticalNews China was the subject of a denial of service attack that originated from China as a result of controversial news reported. The attack was halted when the company's IP service identified the source and blocked it.

Partnerships
In 2011, the firm partnered with ScholarlyMedia’s ScholarlyEditions imprint, publishing 4,000 reference books, which replaced the EncyK line. The president of NewsRx is also president of ScholarlyMedia. The company's book imprint is ScholarlyEditions, and its peer reviewed news service is ScholarlyNews.

The company's partners include:
Dow Jones Factiva and the Wall Street Journal Professional Edition- For 20 years, NewsRx articles have been available through Dow Jones sources.
InfoDesk – InfoDesk allows NewsRx content to be available to desktops, websites, and business applications including site licenses.
Thomson Reuters – The partnership between Reuters and NewsRx began 20 years ago, and with Thomson 10 years ago. In 2008, the two companies merged.
Cambridge Information Group (CIG) – NewsRx content is available through ProQuest, Dialog, and Datastar.
NewsEdge – NewsEdge, a division of Acquire Media, and NewsRx have been partners since 1991.
Cengage Learning - Cengage Learning's Gale has partnered with NewsRx since 1993.

Rankings
The company's rankings include:

Amazon's Alexa 2011 PageRank: #5 News and Media Site for the Pharmaceutical Industry 
Google 2010 PageRank: #2 Among Top Health News and Media Publications
Google 2010 PageRank: #2 Among Top Science Publications in Biology/Physiology
Google 2010 PageRank: #2 Among Top News and Media for the Business of Pharmaceuticals
Amazon's Alexa 2010 PageRank: #2 News and Media Site for the Pharmaceutical Industry  
eHealthcare Leadership Award, Best Health/Healthcare Content 2011

References

Online mass media companies of the United States
Companies based in Atlanta
Newsletter publishing companies
Health publications
AI companies
Information technology companies of the United States
Search algorithms
Companies based in New Haven, Connecticut